Lorenzo Bonincontri, or Bonincontro, latinized as Laurentius Bonincontrius (23 February 1410 - 1491), was an Italian astrologer, humanist and historian of  the 15th century.

Life 
He was born in 1410 in San Miniato.

He lived in different cities in Italy: Naples (1450-75), Florence (1475-78) and Rome (1483-91), where he wrote part of his work. 

He probably died in 1491 in Rome.

Works 
 Rerum naturalium libri, Naples, 1469-1472. Poem in latin hexameters. 
 De rebus coelestibus, aureum opusculum, 1472-1475. Poem in three books of filosofic-astrologic topic dedicated to Ferdinand II of Aragon.
 De rebus coelestibus, Gaurico, Venice, 1526
 
 Chronicon (chronicle from 903 to 1458)
 De ortu Regum Neapolitanorum (or Historia utriusque Siciliae), in 10 books, Florence, 1739-1740. History of the kings of Naples and Sicily.

References

Further reading 
 

1410 births
1491 deaths
Italian astrologers
Italian Renaissance humanists
15th-century Italian historians